Warm-blooded is an informal term referring to animal species the bodies of which maintain a temperature higher than that of their environment. In particular, homeothermic species (including birds and mammals) maintain a stable body temperature by regulating metabolic processes. Other species have various degrees of thermoregulation.

As there are more than two categories of temperature control utilized by animals, the terms warm-blooded and cold-blooded have been deprecated in the scientific field.

Terminology
In general, warm-bloodedness refers to three separate categories of thermoregulation.
Endothermy is the ability of some creatures to control their body temperatures through internal means such as muscle shivering or increasing their metabolism. The opposite of endothermy is ectothermy. 
Homeothermy maintains a stable internal body temperature regardless of external influence and temperatures. The stable internal temperature is often higher than the immediate environment. The opposite is poikilothermy. The only known living homeotherms are mammals and birds, as well as one lizard, the Argentine black and white tegu. Some extinct reptiles such as ichthyosaurs, pterosaurs, plesiosaurs and some non-avian dinosaurs are believed to have been homeotherms.
Tachymetabolism maintains a high "resting" metabolism. In essence, tachymetabolic creatures are "on" all the time. Though their resting metabolism is still many times slower than their active metabolism, the difference is often not as large as that seen in bradymetabolic creatures. Tachymetabolic creatures have greater difficulty dealing with a scarcity of food.

The variety of thermoregulation types
A large proportion of the creatures traditionally called "warm-blooded", like birds and mammals, fit all three of these categories (i.e., they are endothermic, homeothermic, and tachymetabolic).  However, over the past 30 years, studies in the field of animal thermophysiology have revealed many species belonging to these two groups that do not fit all these criteria.  For example, many bats and small birds are poikilothermic and bradymetabolic when they sleep for the night (or, in nocturnal species, for the day).  For these creatures, the term heterothermy was coined.

Further studies on animals that were traditionally assumed to be cold-blooded have shown that most creatures incorporate different variations of the three terms defined above, along with their counterparts (ectothermy, poikilothermy, and bradymetabolism), thus creating a broad spectrum of body temperature types. Some fish have warm-blooded characteristics, such as the opah. Swordfish and some sharks have circulatory mechanisms that keep their brains and eyes above ambient temperatures and thus increase their ability to detect and react to prey. Tunas and some sharks have similar mechanisms in their muscles, improving their stamina when swimming at high speed.

Heat generation

Body heat is generated by metabolism.  This refers to the chemical reactions cells use to break down glucose into water and carbon dioxide and, in so doing, generate adenosine triphosphate (ATP), a high-energy compound used to power other cellular processes. Muscle contraction is a type of metabolic process that generates heat energy, and heat is also generated through friction when blood flows through the circulatory system.

All organisms metabolize food and other inputs, but some make better use of the output than others. Like all energy conversions, metabolism is rather inefficient, and around 60% of the available energy is converted to heat rather than to ATP. In most organisms, this heat is simply lost to the environment. However, endothermic homeotherms (the animals generally characterized as "warm-blooded") both produce more heat and have better ways to retain and regulate it than other animals. They have a higher basal metabolic rate, and also a greater capacity to increase their metabolic rate when engaged in strenuous activity. They usually have well-developed insulation in order to retain body heat: fur and blubber in the case of mammals and feathers in birds. When this insulation is insufficient to maintain body temperature, they may resort to shivering—rapid muscle contractions that quickly use up ATP, thus stimulating cellular metabolism to replace it and consequently produce more heat. Additionally, almost all eutherian mammals have brown adipose tissue whose mitochondria are capable of non-shivering thermogenesis. This process involves the direct dissipation of the mitochondrial gradient as heat via an uncoupling protein, thereby "uncoupling" the gradient from its usual function of driving ATP production via ATP synthase.

In general, in hot environments, they use evaporative cooling to shed excess heat, either by sweating (some mammals) or by panting (many mammals and all birds)—in general, mechanisms not present in poikilotherms.

Defense against fungi
It has been hypothesized that warm-bloodedness evolved in mammals and birds as a defense against fungal infections. Very few fungi can survive the body temperatures of warm-blooded animals. By comparison, insects, reptiles, and amphibians are plagued by fungal infections. Warm-blooded animals have a defense against pathogens contracted from the environment, since environmental pathogens are not adapted to their higher internal temperature.

See also
 
 Mesotherm
 Thermogenic plant

References
Footnotes

Citations

External links

What is Warm Blooded??
The Reptipage: What is cold-blooded?

Animal physiology
Thermoregulation

ca:Sang calenta
it:Omeotermia
pt:Homeotermia